Jorge Manuel Isasi (born in Paraguay) is a Paraguayan footballer currently playing for Santiago Morning of the Primera B Chilena.

Teams
  Unión Temuco 2010
  Real Potosí 2011
  Santiago Morning 2012–present

References

Living people
Paraguayan footballers
Paraguayan expatriate footballers
Santiago Morning footballers
Unión Temuco footballers
Club Real Potosí players
Primera B de Chile players
Expatriate footballers in Chile
Expatriate footballers in Bolivia
Association footballers not categorized by position
Year of birth missing (living people)